Lazzaro Mocenigo (9 July 1624 - 17 July 1657) was an Italian admiral of the Republic of Venice.

Biography
Born in Venice (San Stae), he was the second of four sons of Giovanni di Antonio and Elena di Antonmaria Bernardo, widow of Giorgio Contarini. Mocenigo dedicated his life to the craft of arms, lived on the sea to counter Turkish power, and not without moments of heroism: for example in 1650 in Nixia above Paros when, although wounded by an arrow in his left arm and mutilated of a finger by a musket shot, he continued to fight fiercely.

The outbreak of the war against the Turks, in 1645, allowed him to make a career for himself. By 1650 he was galley governor, and already in 1654, during the first Venetian expedition of the Dardanelles, he was the commander.

When the admiral died and his deputy was recalled to his homeland, he found himself in command of the entire fleet (although officially under the command of the administrator Francesco Morosini, engaged in the defense of the fortress of Candia in Crete) and on June 21, 1655 he engaged in battle the Turks, during the second Venetian expedition to the Dardanelles, defeating the Ottoman fleet, while in 1656 he again distinguished himself in an attempt of unlocking Crete. During this battle, he lost one eye, but continued to fight fiercely. He was nicknamed Kor Kaptan by the Turks ("One-eyed Captain").

He then participated in a third battle in July 1657 (the third Venetian expedition to the Dardanelles). A cannon shot from a Turkish coastal battery caused a veil to fall which hit him, killing him.

He was one of the few Venetian naval officers to have participated, albeit to varying degrees, in all three expeditions to the Dardanelles. His disappearance proved fatal for the fate of the anti-Ottoman alliance. With his death the last battle of the Dardanelles was lost, the Venetian blockade broken, causing a rift among Venice, Malta and the Papal States, while giving the Turks time to prepare a successful counter-offense.

References

1624 births
1657 deaths
Republic of Venice admirals
17th-century Venetian people
Republic of Venice people of the Ottoman–Venetian Wars